Protophyta is a genus of moths in the family Geometridae described by Turner in 1910.

Species
Protophyta benigna Turner, 1939
Protophyta castanea (Lower, 1898)

References

Pseudoterpnini
Geometridae genera